dnaC is a loading factor that complexes with the C-terminus of helicase dnaB and inhibits it from unwinding the dsDNA at a replication fork. A dnaB and dnaC associate near the dnaA bound origin for each of the ssDNA. One dnaB-dnaC complex is oriented in the opposite direction to the other dnaB-dnaC complex due to the antiparallel nature of DNA. Because they are oriented in opposite directions, one dnaB-dnaC complex will complex with dnaA from the N-terminus of dnaB whereas the other dnaB-dnaC complex will complex with dnaA from the dnaC. After the assembly of dnaG onto the N-terminus of dnaB, dnaC is released and dnaB will be allowed to begin unwinding dsDNA to make room for DNA polymerase III to begin synthesizing the daughter strands.

This interaction of dnaC with dnaB requires the hydrolysis of ATP.

References

External links 
 

Bacterial proteins
DNA replication